Ehsan Khorsandi Pishkenari (born March 24, 1985) is an Iranian football player who plays in the striker position. He is currently a member of the club Gohar Zagros.

Club career
Khorsandi made his debut for Persepolis on May 19, 2002, 24th week of 01/02 in the match against Esteghlal Rasht, after serving many years as a Persepolis youth clubs player. He came back to Persepolis youth squads until 05/06 season, when he played for both youth and first squads teams. at the end of 07/08 season, when Persepolis gained its 2nd title in Iran Pro League, he was hesitant of staying or leaving the club, after he was not given no chance to play. at the end he decided to move to Aboumoslem despite he claimed that he had offer from Esteghlal. Khorsandi and Farshid Karimi, are the only players that could win IPL with Persepolis twice.

Club career statistics

 Assist Goals

International career
He was a member of Iran U23 and Iran U20.

Activism 
He was arrested during 2009 Ashura protests.

Honours

Persian Gulf Pro League Winner: 2
2001–02 with Persepolis
2007–08 with Persepolis
2006 Asian Games Bronze Medalist

References

External links
Persian League Profile

1985 births
Living people
Iranian footballers
Persepolis F.C. players
Damash Iranian players
F.C. Aboomoslem players
Asian Games bronze medalists for Iran
Asian Games medalists in football
Footballers at the 2006 Asian Games
Association football forwards
Medalists at the 2006 Asian Games